The 2023 IHF Inter-Continental Trophy was held from 7 to 11 March 2023 in San José, Costa Rica. It was featured a men's youth (U-19) tournament and a men's junior (U-21) tournament. The winners of both events qualified for the World Championships in their respective age categories.

Junior tournament

Qualification

Results

All times are local (UTC–6).

Youth tournament

Qualification

Results

All times are local (UTC–6).

References

IHF Inter-Continental Trophy
IHF Inter-Continental Trophy
IHF Inter-Continental Trophy
International sports competitions hosted by Costa Rica
Sport in San José, Costa Rica
IHF Inter-Continental Trophy
IHF Inter-Continental Trophy